"Chocolate" is a song by UK alternative rock band Snow Patrol. It was released as the third single from their third studio album, Final Straw. The music for the track was written by all four members of the band, while the lyrics are by lead vocalist Gary Lightbody.

The single version is slightly different from the album version. The most noticeable alteration is the drums dropping out in the glockenspiel interlude between the 1st chorus and 2nd verse on the single version.

An edited version of "Chocolate" is featured on the trailer for The Last Kiss starring Zach Braff. It also features in the Torchwood episode "Cyberwoman" and it was used for the highlights on the last 'Wales On Saturday'.

Music video
The video was directed by Marc Webb and was  filmed in New York City. It shows scenes of panic and despair at what is apparently the "end of the world". The centerpiece or focal point of the action is an hourglass that is quickly running out. The implication here is that darkness and death will descend when the last grains of sand have fallen through the bottleneck to the bottom. 

After the lyrics finish lead singer Gary Lightbody walks up and inverts the hourglass. The video fades out to the song's guitar riff repeating.

Track listings
CD
 "Chocolate" (video)
 "Run" (Jackknife Lee Remix) – 7:28
 "One Night Is Not Enough" (Live at the Liquid Rooms) – 4:19

7"
 "Chocolate" – 3:09
 "Run" (Jackknife Lee Remix) – 7:28

Covers
Charlotte Martin covered this song on her 2007 album, Reproductions.
Brian McFadden covered this song on his 2013 album, The Irish Connection.

Reception
Hot Press' reviewer Paul Nolan reviewed the single negatively. He wrote the song was true to its title, as it was "warm" and "anthemic", making comparisons to bands like Coldplay and Starsailor. He did not feel it was strong enough to match up to "Starfighter Pilot", which he called "a prime-time Snow Patrol number". He criticized the record company's approach, writing that the release was an attempt to capitalize on the success on the previous single "Run", Snow Patrol's breakthrough single.

Charts

Certifications

References

External links
 

Snow Patrol songs
Song recordings produced by Jacknife Lee
Songs written by Gary Lightbody
Music videos directed by Marc Webb
1998 songs
Songs written by Nathan Connolly
Songs written by Jonny Quinn
Songs written by Mark McClelland
Fiction Records singles
Interscope Records singles

2004 singles